Charron may refer to:

People
 Charron (rapper), winner of the 2013 106 & Park "Freestyle Friday" competition.
 Al Charron (born 1966), Canadian rugby union rugby player
 Claude Charron (born 1946), Canadian politician
 Craig Charron (1967–2010), American ice hockey player
 Éric Charron (born 1970), Canadian ice hockey player
 Fernand Charron (1866–1928), French racing driver
 Guy Charron (born 1949), Canadian ice hockey player
 Joseph Charron (born 1939), American Catholic bishop
 Louise Charron (born 1951), Canadian jurist
 Pierre Charron (1541–1603), French philosopher
 Sanford E. Charron (1917–2008), American politician

Companies
 Charron (automobile), a French car maker operating from 1907 to 1930

Places

Canada
Charron Lake (Normandin River), Quebec

France
Charron, Charente-Maritime, a commune of the Charente-Maritime département
Charron, Creuse, a commune of the Creuse département

New Caledonia
Ile Charron, an islet of New Caledonia in Mont-Dore

See also
Charon (disambiguation)